Jurjen Pieter "Jurn" de Vries  (born February 1, 1940 in Vrouwenpolder) is a Dutch theologian and former politician and journalist.

De Vries was a member of the Senate from 1999 to 2003 and in 2007. He was also a member of the municipal council of Amersfoort.

He studied theology at the Theological University of the Reformed Churches and is a member of the Reformed Churches in the Netherlands (Liberated).

References 
 Parlement.com biography 

1940 births
Living people
Dutch journalists
Christian Union (Netherlands) politicians
21st-century Dutch politicians
Members of the Senate (Netherlands)
Municipal councillors of Amersfoort
People from Amersfoort
People from Veere
Reformed Churches (Liberated) Christians from the Netherlands
Reformed Political League politicians